Valentina Carnelutti (born 6 February, 1973) is an Italian actress. She has appeared in more than 40 films since 1995.

Selected filmography

References

External links 
 

1973 births
Living people
Italian film actresses